A partial solar eclipse will occur on November 3, 2032. A solar eclipse occurs when the Moon passes between Earth and the Sun, thereby totally or partly obscuring the image of the Sun for a viewer on Earth. A partial solar eclipse occurs in the polar regions of the Earth when the center of the Moon's shadow misses the Earth.

Images 
Animated path

Related eclipses

Solar eclipses 2029–2032

Metonic series

References

External links 

2032 11 3
2032 11 3
2032 11 3
2032 in science